The Salsay Weyane Tigray (SAWET) is a political party in the Tigray Region of Ethiopia.

Policies

In January 2021, SAWET's political programme was outlined as follows:
Establishment of a strong and democratic government in Tigray 
Protection of Tigray's territorial integrity 
Sustainable development 
Protection of the national identity 
Self-determination up to secession
Peace with Eritrea and other neighbours

In September 2020, prior to the 2020 Tigray regional election held that month, SAWET aimed at increased autonomy for Tigray Region, to "secure its territorial integrity, promote its language, and preserve its heritage."

September 2020 election
SAWET won 7,136 votes out of the 2,633,848 votes cast, winning no seats in the September 2020 election. The Tigray Regional Council resulting from the election established a mechanism for minority parties to propose agendas and bills, present motions, propose policy and nominate appointees. SAWET criticised the mechanism as insufficient to "bring about the desired outcome for a vibrant democratic process". SAWET was allotted two seats on the council.

Tigray War
In January 2021, during the Tigray War, the National Election Board of Ethiopia (NEBE) asked SAWET for an "explanation about [its] activities" before taking a possible decision on deregistering the party in relation to its participation in the September 2020 Tigray election, that NEBE considered illegal.

On 2 February 2021, SAWET, together with National Congress of Great Tigray and Tigray Independence Party, estimated there to have been 52,000 civilian casualties of the Tigray War.

Leadership 
Hayalu Godefay is founder and chairperson of Salsay Weyane Tigray.

Alula Hailu is vice-chairman.

Hailu Kebede, foreign affairs head, was arrested in Addis Ababa by the Ethiopian authorities in August 2021.

References

Ethnic political parties in Ethiopia
Political parties in Ethiopia